

Dendrochilum (commonly abbreviated Ddc. in horticulture) is a genus of epiphytic, lithophytic and a few terrestrial flowering plants in the orchid family (Orchidaceae). These orchids are popular among fans of non-traditional orchid curiosities.

Distribution and description

They are distributed at higher elevations in the humid rainforests throughout the Malesian region, with some in the surrounding lands; thus they occur from Southeast Asia to New Guinea. But most species are found on Borneo or the Philippines.

This genus produces miniature, fragrant, star-shaped flowers that are generally produced in two rows on erect or arching pendant, many-flowered racemes.

Taxonomy
The precise number of species is disputed; many websites accept as few as 100 or so, while others recognize far more. The World Checklist of Monocotyledons for example lists 390 records, including names that have become synonyms. Numerous new taxa have become known in recent decades; in the Dendrochilum species list on Wikipedia, a more split-up approach is followed pending more up-to-date information. For it seems that the very low species numbers are certainly gross overlumping, and while the very high numbers sometimes presented are probably a result of oversplitting, they are likely to be closer to the truth.

Many of these orchids (67 species in the list used here) were named by Johannes Jacobus Smith, an eminent Dutch botanist. The genus' type species, described by  Carl Ludwig Blume in 1825, is Dendrochilum aurantiacum of Java and Sumatra. Several species were formerly separated in Acoridium (established by Christian Gottfried Daniel Nees von Esenbeck and Franz Julius Ferdinand Meyen in 1843) or Platyclinis (established by George Bentham in 1881), but these two taxa are nowadays regarded as synonyms of Dendrochilum.

Selected species
 Dendrochilum anfractum
 Dendrochilum aurantiacum
 Dendrochilum cobbianum
 Dendrochilum cootesii
 Dendrochilum glumaceum
 Dendrochilum ignisiflorum
 Dendrochilum javieriense
 Dendrochilum longifolium
 Dendrochilum magnum

Footnotes

References
  (1995): The genus Dendrochilum. In: Orchids Australia.
  (2004): The genus Dendrochilum. In: : Genera Orchidacearum (Vol. 3). Oxford University Press, Oxford, UK.
  (2002): Dendrochilum: elegance in miniature. Orchid Review 110(1246): 212-217.
  (1997): The genus Dendrochilum (Orchidaceae) in the Philippines – a taxonomic revision. Opera Botanica 131: 5-205.
  (1997): Orchids of Borneo (Vol.3: Dendrobium, Dendrochilum and others). Sabah Society, Kota Kinabalu and Royal Botanic Gardens, Kew.

External links

 
Arethuseae genera
Epiphytic orchids